Basanta Kumar Biswas (6 February 1895 – 11 May 1915) was an Indian pro-independence activist involved in the Jugantar group who, in December 1912, played a role in the bombing of the Viceroy's parade in what came to be known as the Delhi-Lahore Conspiracy.  

Biswas was one of the illustrious names of the early pro-independence activists of Bengal and the entire country. He was expert in bomb making and was initiated into revolutionary movement by Jugantar leaders Amarendranath Chattopadhyaya and Rash Behari Bose.

Early life 
Basanta Kumar Biswas was born on 6 February 1895 at Poragacha in Nadia district of West Bengal, to Matilal and Kunjabala Biswas. He belonged to the family of freedom fighter Digamabar Biswas, an active leader of the Indigo revolt (Nil Bidroha) and freedom fighter Manmathnath Biswas was his cousin. He started his schooling in M. I. School in nearby village Madhavpur with his cousin Manmathnath Biswas. In 1906, Basanta was moved to Muragacha school. Under the guidance of Khirodh Chandra Ganguly, Head teacher of Muragacha school, Basanta started his journey of freedom fight. He started to work on his own at a very young age, sent to Puri, and eventually went to Benaras, where he stayed at Ramkrishna Mission in 1910. Next year he met Rash Behari Bose in Dehradun and was recruited by him. Bose trained him in arms and bombs, often called him Bishe.

Revolutionary activities
Basanta Kumar Biswas was a member of Jugantar group, known for his organization skills and was an important intermediary between Calcutta office of Jugantar and the 'co-conspirators' in Chandannagar. Biswas was part of a conspiracy to bomb the Viceroy's parade in Delhi. On 23 December 1912, the revolutionaries threw a bomb at Charles Hardinge, who was riding with his wife on an elephant during a procession at Chandni Chowk. Hardinge escaped with flesh wounds, but the servant behind him holding his parasol was killed. The authors of the deed remained obscure for many months despite the state's intense investigation, and lucrative reward. Apparently Biswas, dressed in a burqa,  threw the bomb from the terrace of the then Punjab National Bank building in Chandni Chowk, Delhi.

Biswas was arrested on 26 February 1914 at Poragachha, Nadia while he went to perform the last rites for his father. The trial, which came to be called the Delhi-Lahore Conspiracy Case, began on 23 May 1914 in Delhi; Amir Chand, Abadh Behari, and Bhai Balmukund, were condemned to death in the trial, and Basanta Biswas was found guilty but initially sentenced to life imprisonment as he was just seventeen years of old.

An appeal was formulated at Lahore High Court. The Crown won its appeal and Biswas was sentenced to be hanged.

Basanta Kumar Biswas was hanged on 11 May 1915 at Ambala Central Jail in Punjab aged twenty and became one of the youngest people to be executed during the Indian revolutionary struggles during the 20th century.

Legacy
There is a statue of Basanta Biswas established by Rasbihari Basu in a park of Tokyo, Japan. Another statue is situated in front of Rabindra Bhawan, Krishnanagar, Nadia. A school in civil lines, Delhi was named "Shaheed Basant Kumar Biswas Sarvodaya Vidhyalaya" in his memory. Although it was later renamed to Rajkiya Pratibha Vikas Vidhyalaya. Loka Sabha Speaker Meira Kumar has installed a photo of Basanta Kumar at the Museum of the Indian Parliament. Ujjal Biswas, an Indian politician and the present Minister in the Government of West Bengal belongs to the family of Basanta Biswas.

See also
 Indian National Army
 Arzi Hukumate Azad Hind

References

External links
 Biography
 The Tribune article
 AICC website article

1895 births
1915 deaths
Anushilan Samiti
Revolutionary movement for Indian independence
Indian revolutionaries
Executed Indian people
20th-century executions by the United Kingdom
People executed by British India by hanging
Indian independence activists from West Bengal
People from Nadia district